The Outer Circle Railway was opened in stages in 1890 and 1891, as a steam-era suburban railway line, in Melbourne, Australia. It traversed much of the modern City of Boroondara, including the suburbs of (from north to south) Kew East, Camberwell, Burwood, Ashburton, and Malvern East. At its longest, it ran from Fairfield station, on what is today the Hurstbridge line, to Oakleigh station, on the current Pakenham and Cranbourne lines.

History
The Outer Circle railway was first advocated in 1867, by a group known as the Upper Yarra Railway League, who suggested that the Gippsland Railway could be brought into Melbourne via the outer suburbs. However, the term itself was coined in 1873 by Engineer-in-Chief of the Victorian Railways, Thomas Higinbotham, who suggested an "outer circle route".

Construction of the Gippsland line was authorised in 1873, but the line, which was to be operated by the Victorian Railways, could not be brought into Melbourne by the direct route used today because the privately owned Melbourne and Hobson's Bay United Railway Company (M&HBUR) controlled the line from Flinders Street to South Yarra, and there was no connection between the privately run Flinders Street station and the Victorian Railways station at Spencer Street. That problem was solved when the M&HBUR was purchased by the government in 1878, and the direct rail line from South Yarra to Oakleigh was opened the next year.

Agitation for the Outer Circle line was then taken over by politicians and land speculators. It was included in the 1882 Railway Construction Act, and was authorised by the 1884 Railway Construction Act, passed on 12 December 1884. The act also authorised the construction of a viaduct connecting Flinders Street and Spencer Street stations. By 1885, two of the parliamentarians who had helped gain approval for the line, F.E. Beaver and James Munro, had purchased half the land adjoining the new railway.

Construction commenced in 1888 and was completed in 1891. The Outer Circle connected Camberwell station (on the modern Belgrave and Lilydale lines) with Oakleigh station to the south, via Riversdale on what is now the Alamein line. The northern section ran from Riversdale to Fairfield station (then called Fairfield Park).

There was also a branch line from the closed Waverley Road station (near the modern East Malvern station) to Darling and Burnley. That was the first section of what later became the Glen Waverley line, and was opened a few weeks before the Outer Circle.

Despite that, the line never carried Gippsland traffic, and the severe economic depression of the early 1890s meant that suburban development along the line ceased.

Services

The first section of the Outer Circle opened was on 24 March 1890, from Oakleigh to Waverley Road, and on to Burnley. It was followed by the line from Waverley Road to Camberwell on 24 March 1890, and the Riversdale to Fairfield Park section on 24 March 1891. From this time the line was operated as three different passenger services:
 Oakleigh to Burnley, change at Waverley Road for,
 Waverly Road to Camberwell, change at Riversdale for,
 Riversdale to Fairfield Park.

Lack of passengers led to service cuts, and the Riversdale to Fairfield Park section was closed completely from 12 April 1893, being replaced by a horse bus service. The Oakleigh to Ashburton and Darling section closed on 9 December 1895, and the last section, from Camberwell to Ashburton, closed on 1 May 1897. Camberwell to Ashburton was reopened 4 July 1898 as the Ashburton line.

Station histories

Today 

Today, the southern section of the line from Camberwell to Alamein is part of the Melbourne suburban railway network as the Alamein line. The northern section of the line, starting at East Camberwell, has been converted into the Outer Circle Trail, a walking and bicycle path. All of the closed stations have since been demolished, as has the railway infrastructure of the line, but some road overbridges and underbridges remain. The rail bridge over the Yarra River was converted into a road bridge as part of the Chandler Highway sometime after 1919. The track between Fairfield station and the northern bank of the Yarra River came into use from 1919 as the APM Siding, serving a paper mill built on the site.

Proposals for re-opening the line are regularly canvassed online.

Media
In 2014, a documentary, Melbourne's Forgotten Railway - The Outer Circle, was produced by a Melbourne-based media production team, led by Ron Killeen and Andrew McColm. It documented the line and included "historians, an urban planning expert, as well as people who actually remember seeing and riding on the train". A discussion on the development of the documentary, including information about some inaccuracies, is also available.

See also
Inner Circle railway line
Outer Circle Bicycle Path
Melbourne's Forgotten Railway Discussion
The Outer Circle Line documentary (in production)

References

Sources
 

Closed Melbourne railway lines
Railway lines opened in 1890
Rail trails in Victoria (Australia)
5 ft 3 in gauge railways in Australia
1891 establishments in Australia